The Governor of Les Invalides is a French military personality and figure, named by the French Government to direct the institution of the Hôtel des Invalides of Paris.

History 
Since creation, the Hôtel des Invalides was directed by Governors until 1792. A General Administration Council ensured the direction of the institute from 1793 to 1796. Since then, the latter's directorate was exercised successively by Commandants, from 1796 to 1803, Governors from 1803 to 1871, then Commandants from 1871 to 1941, and again by Governors since that date.

Attributions 

The function is assured by a général officer nominated for a period of five years by the President of France based on the proposition of the Council of Ministers. These attributions are fixed by a decree of February 25, 1961, modified by another decree of May 6, 1991.

The Governors of Les Invalides is member by rights of Law to the administration council of the national Institute of Les Invalides, at the title of the representatives of the State, with the title of Vice-President. « Designated to represent the President of the Republic, titular protector of the Institution, near by the retired veterans and military wounded, hospitalized at the Invalides, he exhausts all his influence so that the concerned veterans, in all sort of, and under any circumstances, are attested for their service and have the recognition of the Nation. ».

He is a member by right of Law of the Musée de l'Armée. He authorizes all the diverse manifestations and official ceremonies that take lieu at the corps of the Hôtel des Invalides, out of which notably the Cathedral Saint-Louis of Les Invalides. He resides in the Hôtel des Invalides, along with his secretariat. If he dies in office while in official function tenure, he could be buried in the Governors Vaults.

Since August 1, 2017, the Governor of Les Invalides is Army corps general Christophe de Saint-Chamas, who succeeded to général d'armée Bertrand Ract-Madoux, resigning from the date of May 12, 2017.

Governors and Commandants of Les Invalides since 1670 
 1670–1678: François Lemaçon d'Ormoy (1...–1677)
 1678–1696: Chevalier André Blanchard de Saint-Martin (1613–1696)
 1696–1705:  (1626–1705)
 1705–1728: Alexandre de Boyveau (1646–1727), Maréchal de camp
 1728–1730: Eugène de Beaulieu
 1730–1738: Pierre de Vissec (1652–1737)
 1738–1742: Joseph de Mornay (1670–1742), designated simultaneously as Marnais de la Bastie, Knight of Saint-André
 1742–1753: Jean-Marie Cornier de la Courneuve (1670–1753)
 1753–1766: General François d'Azemard (1695–1766)
 1766–1783: Lieutenant-General  (1713–1783)
 1783–1786: Lieutenant-General  (1715–1786)
 1786–1792: Charles-François Virot, Marquis de Sombreuil (1727–1794)
 1793–1796: General Council Administration
 1796–1796: General  (1757–1813), Commandant
 1796–1797: General , Commandant
 1797–1804: General Jean-François Berruyer (1738–1804), Commandant then designated as Governor on August 28, 1803
 1804–1815: Marshal Jean Mathieu Philibert Sérurier (1742–1819)
 1816–1821: Marshal François Henri de Franquetot (1737–1821)
 1821–1822: Marshal  (1755–1832), interim Governor of the Royal Hotel of Les Invalides from May 19, 1821, until January 1, 1822
 1822–1830: General Victor de Faÿ (1768–1850)
 1830–1833: Marshal Jean-Baptiste Jourdan (1762–1833)
 1833–1842: Marshal Bon Adrien Jeannot de Moncey, Duke of Cornegliano (1754–1842)
 1842–1847: Marshal Nicolas Charles Oudinot, Duke of Reggio (1767–1847), died in office while in official function tenure at the age 80
 1847–1848: Marshal of France Gabriel Jean Joseph Molitor (1770–1849)
 1848–1852: Prince Jérôme Napoléon (1784–1860)
 1852–1853: Divisional general Jean-Toussaint Arrighi de Casanova (1778–1853), died in office while in official function tenure at age 75
 1853–1863: Marshal of France Philippe Antoine d'Ornano (1784–1863), died in office while in official function tenure at age 79
 1863–1870: Divisional general  (1786–1870), senator of the Second French Empire; died in office while in official function tenure at age 84
 1870–1871: Divisional general Edmond-Charles de Martimprey (1808–1883), Senator of the Second French Empire
 1871–1891: General Louis Sumpt (1816–1891), Commandant
 1891–1902: Brigadier general Paul-Édouard Arnoux (1822–1902), Commandant
 1902–1919: Divisional general Gustave Léon Niox (1840–1921), Commandant
 1919–1923: Brigadier general Gabriel Malleterre (1858–1923), Commandant, died in office while in official function tenure at age 65
 1924–1944: Brigadier general  (1864–1944), Commandant then Governor in 1941, died in office while in official function tenure at age 80
 1944–1944: Brigadier general Guy Pinon (1888–1947)
 1944–1951: Divisional general Antoine Rodes (1870–1951), died in office while in official function tenure at age 81
 1951–1960: Army air general Jean Houdémon (1885–1960), died in office while in official function tenure at age 75
 1961–1962: Divisional general André Kientz (1896–1962), died in office while in official function tenure at age 66
 1962–1964: Army corps general Raoul Magrin-Vernerey (1892–1964), died in office while in official function tenure at age 72
 1 September 1964 – 30 March 1973: Brigadier general Jacques de Grancey (1893–1973), died in office while in official function tenure at age 80
 15 July 1973 – 14 July 1991: Army general Gabriel de Galbert (1912–2001)
 15 July 1991 – 31 December 1996: Army general Maurice Schmitt (1930–)
 1 January 1997 – 30 June 2002: Army general Bertrand de Lapresle (1937–)
 1 July 2002 – 30 June 2009: Army general  (1941–)
 1 July 2009 – 31 August 2014: Army general  (1947–)
 19 September 2014 – 22 May 2017: Army general Bertrand Ract-Madoux (1953–)
 Since 1 August 2017: Army corps general Christophe de Saint-Chamas (1959–)

See also 
 Military governor of Paris
 Lieutenant-General (France)
 Marshal of France
 Musée de l'Armée

External links 
 Official Website of Les Invalides .

References

Notes 

Military ranks of France